Jason Cowley is the name of:

Jason Cowley (footballer)
Jason Cowley (journalist)